South Station Tower is a skyscraper under construction in Boston, Massachusetts, the high-rise portion of a three-building development. Construction on Phase 1 of the project, a 51-story, 678-foot tower with offices and condominiums, started in January 2020 and is expected to take 4 years.  It will be built atop Boston's historic South Station complex, an example of transit-oriented development. The overall project will include condominium units, office space, a parking structure, and possibly hotel space. The property was initially proposed by Hines Interests and TUDC, a subsidiary of Tufts University.

Part of Phase I, an expanded bus station, will use a foundation put in place when the station was last renovated in the late 1980s. The high-rise tower will be supported by a new foundation constructed in the area between the existing station and the tracks.  Foot traffic will be rerouted around construction areas.

History

South Station Tower was planned to break ground in 2008, with completion scheduled to occur in 2010, but the project stalled. Approval has been obtained for a project totaling . As of March 2016 the developer's website was updated stating the tower would begin construction early in 2017; the FAA had given approval in February for a tower reaching 677 feet. The developer's rights to build on the site were scheduled to expire in April 2017, but the state extended them until the end of the year. Construction was halted due to MBTA concerns, but Hines did not stop the project. 

Development of the airspace above the southbound tracks has been delayed several times.  The building was conceived by Tufts president Jean Mayer, who foresaw an "epicenter of high-profile medical research" in downtown Boston. In 1991, Tufts created a for-profit development subsidiary, TUDC LLC, and acquired the rights to the airspace. Development over the past decade has been complicated by Boston waterfront zoning restrictions, which require pedestrian access to the waterfront. In 1997, TUDC brought on Hines Interests LP as a development partner. In 2006, TUDC and Hines filed a Development Plan for the project.

Questions were raised in 2007 about the university's role in the project, and Tufts withdrew in 2009.

South Station Tower was originally designed with a height of 759 feet (231 m), which included a decorative spire. However, the project was downscaled in 2006.

In July 2016, the developer filed a "Notice of Project Change" with the Boston Planning and Development Agency (BPDA), proposing a number of changes in the project, including the addition of more residential space. The notice included a timeline calling for construction of the project's first building, the high-rise tower, to begin in 2017.  In December 2016, the board of the BPDA approved construction of the project. It was delayed to December 2017, then delayed again to 2018 due to MBTA rights. Construction officially began in February 2020, with a five year completion timeline.

Design
Preliminary design was done by architect Cesar Pelli, whose designs are reminiscent of his Wells Fargo Center in Minneapolis. The structure has been LEED pre-certified "silver" and won the EPA's "Green design" award.

See also
List of tallest buildings in Boston

References

External links
Developer website
Architecture Boston on project
South Station Air Rights website

Proposed skyscrapers in the United States
Leadership in Energy and Environmental Design basic silver certified buildings
Skyscrapers in Boston